Muskox Fjord is a fjord in King Christian X Land, East Greenland. Administratively it lies in the Northeast Greenland National Park area. This fjord is part of the Kaiser Franz Joseph Fjord system.

History

Muskox Fjord was mapped in 1899 during the Swedish Greenland Expedition in search of survivors of S. A. Andrée's Arctic balloon expedition of 1897 led by Swedish Arctic explorer Alfred Gabriel Nathorst (1850–1921). It was named Moskusoksefjorden after the muskox of which Nathorst saw a quite large herd near the shores of the fjord, one of the areas in East Greenland providing a habitat for this resilient Arctic mammal.

There are Norwegian hunting huts by the shores of the fjord.

Geography
Muskox Fjord is a branch of the Nordfjord, a tributary of Kaiser Franz Joseph Fjord. Its entrance is located in the eastern shore of the head of Nordfjord, southeast of the terminus of the Waltershausen Glacier, between Cape Kolthoff in the south and Cape Bull in the north.

It  stretches roughly towards the southeast for almost , curving northeastwards for the last  until the head. 

Muskox Fjord separates Hudson Land in the north from the Gauss Peninsula in the south.

Bibliography
A. K. Higgins, Jane A. Gilotti, M. Paul Smith (eds.), The Greenland Caledonides: Evolution of the Northeast Margin of Laurentia.

See also
List of fjords of Greenland

References

External links
 Sedimentary processes and paleoenvironments in Moskusoksefjord
 Geology of North-East Greenland
Fjords of Greenland